Dialectica cordiaecola is a moth of the family Gracillariidae. It is known from South Africa.

The larvae feed on Cordia caffra. They mine the leaves of their host plant. The mine has the form of an irregular, semi-transparent blotch-mine. It is reddish-brown with a whitish margin.

References

Endemic moths of South Africa
Dialectica (moth)
Moths of Africa
Moths described in 1961